Rogilla was a chestnut Australian thoroughbred gelding, who was a versatile racehorse performing in Australia. Known as the Coalfields Champion from Newcastle, Rogilla raced during a vintage era of the Australian turf. He won in each of the six seasons that he raced as a three-year-old to an eight-year-old. Rogilla was an outstanding galloper in Sydney and Melbourne on wet or dry tracks recording 26 wins from 4½ furlongs to 2 miles with regular jockey Darby Munro winning 16 races.

Breeding 
He was by Roger de Busli (GB) and his dam Speargila was by Brakespear (GB). Roger de Busli (GB) won three races from 20 starts in England. He commenced stud duties in 1925, but sired only one other winner of a principal race in Oro 1935 AJC Metropolitan Handicap.

Rogilla's dam Speargila was a good racemare that won 13 races in Sydney, plus 10 other provincial and country races. Speargila was line-bred to Prince Charlie, as both Lochiel and Clan Stuart were sired by him. She was the dam of six foals, which all raced and were winners. Rogilla was the second foal.

His breeder, Hunter White of Havilah, was a well known Australian Jockey Club committeeman (1910–1940) and granted three consecutive leases to Rogilla's trainer.

Racing career 
Rogilla began his racing career two months short of his fourth season. His racing colours were black, with red armbands and cap. Rogilla was lightly framed and 15.3 hands tall and despite various injuries and illnesses was best remembered for his tremendous courage against the best in the depression era. In 17 of the races he contested he won eight by a neck or less, lost four by a neck or less and figured in five dead heats for first. He always pulled hard in races, which cost him any chance in the three Melbourne Cups he contested.

His best season was at six years of age, when he won 11 from 17 starts and in 1934 he defeated the champion Peter Pan in four successive meetings including the AJC Kings Cup.

Rogilla when racing in Melbourne was stabled at Caulfield with trainer Cecil T Godby who trained the Caulfield Cup winners Purser 1924, Gaine Carrington 1933 and Northwind 1936.

J.E.(Ted) Boadle proprietor 'Star Shoeing Forge' Hamilton, Newcastle was a master blacksmith and racecourse farrier for 33 years originally from Grafton was accredited with Rogilla's success to withstand racing over multiple seasons when shod with special bar shoes and raced in bar plates also accompanied trainer Les Haigh to Melbourne for the 1932 Caulfield Cup . Ted Boadle also put the first set of shoes on the champion Beauford best remembered for his historic clashes with the wonder horse Gloaming and in later years was secretary of the Newcastle Farriers Association for a 6-year period.

Trainer Les Haigh was born in 1892 at Bega and a former jockey in the Muswellbrook area relocated his stables at 64 Everton Street Hamilton, Newcastle to Sydney and in 1934 purchased leading Randwick trainer Frank Marsden's 10 box stables at 11 Bowral Street Kensington directly opposite the now Tulloch Lodge. The 'Gaulusville' stables are legendary and were built and named soon after 1897 by Melbourne Cup winning jockey Stephen Callinan who rode Gaulus to victory but it was also Phar Lap who began his racing career there in 1929.

Frank Marsden originally from Gunnedah was mentor to the outstanding gallopers Furious 1921 VRC Derby & VRC Oaks, Richmond Main 1919 AJC Derby & VRC Derby, Prince Viridis 1918 AJC St Leger & VRC St Leger, Cagou 1913 & 1917 AJC Metropolitan Handicap and the 1919 & 1922 AJC Sydney Cup winners Ian 'Or & Prince Charles.

Rogilla's racing record: 70 starts for 26 wins (including 5 dead heats), 12 seconds, 11 thirds and 21 unplaced runs.

1933 & 1934 racebooks

Image gallery

Pedigree

References 

1927 racehorse births
Cox Plate winners
Racehorses bred in Australia
Racehorses trained in Australia
Thoroughbred family 8-k
Sydney Cup winners
Caulfield Cup winners